Tashbiha Binte Shahid Mila (known as Mila Islam) is a Bangladeshi folk and pop singer.

Biography
Mila was born and raised in Chittagong, Bangladesh to Shahed Islam and Shopna Islam. She studied at Chittagong Grammar School and College, from where she completed HSC. She began her music career in 2006, by performing at local events, especially in ‘Gaye-Holuds’ in Chittagong where she lived.

She moved to Dhaka to build up her career in the music industry and released the album Fele Asha (Left Behind), composed by Balam, in 2006. Mila's second album, Chapter 2, had songs named "Rupbane Nachey Kamor Dolaiya" and "Baburam Shapura", composed by Fuad. Her third album, Re-defined, was released in 2009, also composed by Fuad.

Islam performed at Bangladesh China Friendship Conference Centre on 19 November 2008 in Fuad Live, a music event featuring live performances of songs composed, re-arranged and mixed by Fuad.

Islam married her 10 years long boyfriend, Parvez Sanjari, a US-Bangla Airlines pilot on 12 May 2017. After 13 days of their marriage, Islam filed a case against her husband Parvez of cheating and torturing her physically. She started the case under the Prevention of Repression against Women and Children Act and police arrested him the same night. She alleged that, Sanjari took ৳500,000 (BDT) as dowry and assaulted her on 3 October 2017, when she refused to give him ৳1,000,000 Taka more. The couple got divorced after four months of their marriage.

Discography 
 Fele Asha (Left Behind) (2006)
 Chapter 2 (2007)
 Re-defined (2009)
 Uncensored (2015)

References

Living people
21st-century Bangladeshi women singers
21st-century Bangladeshi singers
Musicians from Chittagong
1988 births
Chittagong Cantonment Public College alumni